The Flanders F.4 was a 1910s British experimental military two-seat monoplane aircraft that was designed and built by Howard Flanders as a development of the Flanders F.3.

Development
Following success with the Flanders F.3 experimental monoplane in the spring of 1912, the British War Office ordered four Flanders monoplanes for use by the newly formed Royal Flying Corps. The aircraft had the same configuration as the F.3 but was improved with larger cockpits, accommodating a crew of two in tandem, was powered by a 70 hp (52 kW) Renault engine driving a four-bladed propeller and had other modifications to improve reliability and maintainability. The fixed landing gear of the F.3 was improved with the addition of coil-spring suspension. The first aircraft was flying at Brooklands by 6 July 1912, with all four flown and delivered to the RFC by 2 January 1913. Testing showed the monoplanes flew well, but following the fatal crashes of a Deperdussin and a Bristol-Coanda Monoplane on 6 and 10 September 1912, the Royal Flying Corps had banned the use of monoplanes and the aircraft were not used, with their engines being removed to power Royal Aircraft Factory BE.2s.

Operators

Royal Flying Corps

Specifications (F.4)

See also

References
Notes

Bibliography
 Bruce, J.M. The Aeroplanes of the Royal Flying Corps (Military Wing). London:Putnam, 1982. .
 The Illustrated Encyclopedia of Aircraft (Part Work 1982–1985), 1985, Orbis Publishing

1910s British experimental aircraft
F04
Single-engined tractor aircraft
Shoulder-wing aircraft
Aircraft first flown in 1912